The 2015 Federation Tournament of Champions took place in Albany at the SEFCU Arena, home court of the University at Albany, SUNY basketball teams, on March 27, 28 and 29. The usual Albany venue, the Times Union Center in downtown Albany, was unavailable because the venue instead hosted the NCAA Women's Basketball Albany Regional. Federation championships were awarded in the AA, A and B classifications. Wings Academy in the Bronx won the Class AA championship. Jessie Govan of Wings Academy was named the Class AA tournament's Most Valuable Player.

Class AA

Participating teams

Results 

Wings Academy finished the season with a 30-2 record.

Individual honors 

The following players were awarded individual honors for their performances at the Federation Tournament:

Most Valuable Player 

 Jessie Govan, Wings Academy

All-Tournament Team 

 Rawle Alkins, Christ the King
 Desure Buie, Wings Academy
 Tyrone Cohen, Christ the King
 Efrain DeJesus, Wings Academy
 Devonte Green, Long Island Lutheran
 Thomas Huerter, Shenendehowa

Sportsmanship Award 

 Tyrone Cohen, Christ the King

Class A

Participating teams

Results 

Canisius finished the season with a 25-5 record.

Individual honors 

The following players were awarded individual honors for their performances at the Federation Tournament:

Most Valuable Player 

 LaTerrance Reed, Canisius

All-Tournament Team 

 Joel Boyce, Springfield Gardens
 Joe Cremo, Scotia-Glenville
 Josh Huffman, Canisius
 Stafford Trueheart, Canisius
 Hameir Wright, Albany Academy

Sportsmanship Award 

 Rory Flaherty, Albany Academy

Class B

Participating teams

Results 

Park finished the season with a 22-3 record.

Individual honors 

The following players were awarded individual honors for their performances at the Federation Tournament:

Most Valuable Player 

 Jordan Nwora, Park

All-Tournament Team 

 Jeremy Bonifacio, Dwight
 Derek Cheatom, Park
 Randy Golda, Park
 Jordan Roland, Westhill
 Pablo Tamer, Maspeth

Sportsmanship Award 

 Michael Bugaj, Maspeth

External links 

 http://www.nysbasketballbrackets.com/

References

High school basketball competitions in the United States
High school sports in New York (state)
Sports competitions in Albany, New York
Basketball competitions in New York (state)
High
New York
New York state high school boys basketball championships